Chalo is a 2018 Indian Telugu-language romantic comedy film written and directed by director Venky Kudumula marking his debut as a director. The film, produced by Usha Mulpuri on Ira Creations banner features Naga Shourya and Rashmika Mandanna (in her Telugu debut). Mahati Swara Sagar composed the soundtrack and the background score for the film while Sai Sriram provided the cinematography and Kotagiri Venkateswara Rao did the editing for the film. The film was extensively shot in Hyderabad. 

Released worldwide on 2 February 2018, the film became Naga Shourya's highest-grosser in India and overseas.

Plot 
 
The story starts with a man entering a jail cell. The other prisoner asks the man about his story, and the man tells. Actually, he is the father of Hari  a young man who loves fights. When the boy was little and would cry, the father would then let him beat someone which made him happy. As he became older, he started getting in every fight. The police told Hari's parents that if he did anymore wrong things, they'd punish the parents. So they decide to send Hari to Tirupur, a place where fights happen everyday, so that he gets tired of them. When he enters the college, he goes to the shed behind the college to participate in the fight match between Tamil and Telugu people, where he accidentally helps Tamil people and be friends them and he will see Karthika in the shed supporting the fights and instantly fall in love with her. Later she also develops feelings for him, but tells him to get her parents approval for their marriage. But accidentally he helps Karthika's father enemy and learns that there is a huge war from 1953 between Tamil and Telugu people in the village, and Karthika is a Tamilian.

Cast 

 Naga Shourya as Hari, Karthika's love interest
 Rashmika Mandanna as L. Karthika, Hari's love interest and Veeramuthu Jr's daughter
 Achyuth Kumar as Keshava, Veeramuthu's rival turned friend [at the end]
 Mime Gopi as Veeramuthu, L. Karthika's father
 Naresh as Hari's father
 Pragathi as Hari's mother
 Viva Harsha as Telugu student in college
 Satya as Sathya, Tamil student in college
 Raghu Babu as Principal Paramathma, Hari and Karthika's principal
 Vennela Kishore as Revenge Param, Karthika's fiancee
 Praveen as Auto Driver Bose, Hari's friend
 Posani Krishna Murali as Lecturer of Hari and Karthika
 Rajendran as Senior Veeramuthu
 Vasu Inturi as Nalla Seenu, College Canteen owner
 Sivannarayana Naripeddi 
 Swapnika as Raji, Karthika's friend
 Venugopalas Param's father
 G. M. Kumar as Zamindar

Soundtrack 

Music composed by Mahati Swara Sagar. Music released on Aditya Music Company.

Reception 
The Times of India rated the film three out of five stars and stated "Despite the story of Chalo being somewhat a cliché, director Venky somehow cleverly manages to turn the tropes into a fun and interesting ride." Srivathsan Nadadhur of The Hindu wrote:"Chalo is a good showreel for Naga Shaurya; it’s within the commercial domain and also one where we see his range as an actor." Hemanth Kumar of Firstpost gave the film a rating of 3/5 and opined that "Chalo turns the concept of cross-border enmity into a hilarious premise that’s full of surprises."

Awards and nominations

References

External links 

2010s Telugu-language films
2018 romantic comedy films
2018 directorial debut films
Indian romantic comedy films